Hammersmith: Prelude and Scherzo, more commonly known as just Hammersmith, Op. 52, is a wind band work composed by English composer Gustav Holst in 1930. Commissioned by the BBC Military Band, the piece is based on Holst's love for the London borough of Hammersmith. The writing is more musically challenging than Holst's other wind band works, and is a wind band essential today. A typical performance runs for 14 minutes.

History

Composition and inspiration 
Holst was commissioned to compose the work by the BBC Military Band in 1930, and he finished the work that same year. It was Holst's first wind band work after 19 years, his last being the Second Suite in F for Military Band. Holst also orchestrated a version for a full orchestra in 1931. The piece is based on Holst's love for the London borough of Hammersmith. Imogen Holst, Gustav Holst's daughter, writes in her biography of Gustav:

Those who knew nothing of this forty-year-old affection for the Hammersmith district of London were puzzled at the title... Its mood is the outcome of long years of familiarity with the changing crowds and the changing river: those Saturday night crowds, who were always good-natured even when they were being pushed off the pavement into the middle of the traffic... As for the river, he had known it since he was a student... In Hammersmith the river is the background to the crowd: it is a river that goes on its way unnoticed and unconcerned.

Performances 
Hammersmith's premiere was performed by the United States Marine Band at the American Bandmasters Association Convention in Washington, D.C., in 1932. This was the only performance of the work during Holst's lifetime. The orchestral version, published by Boosey & Hawkes, remained in print, but the band version was completely lost after Holst's death in 1934. In 1954, Robert Cantrick, the band director at the Carnegie Institute of Technology, worked with Imogen Holst to reassemble the complete parts after Imogen Holst found the original manuscript. The second performance was given by the Kiltie Band under Cantrick on 14 April 1954, upon which Boosey & Hawkes published it. Since then, Hammersmith has gained widespread recognition, and is considered a professional band essential today.

Instrumentation

Band Version 
The band version is orchestrated for a military band.

Woodwinds
2 flutes
2 E clarinets (2nd optional)
2 oboes (2nd optional)
Solo B clarinet
3 B clarinets
E alto saxophone
B tenor saxophone
2 bassoons (2nd optional)
Brass
4 French horns in F (3rd and 4th optional)
Solo B cornet
2 cornets
2 trumpets
3 trombones
Baritone
Basses
Percussion
Timpani
Snare drum
Bass drum
Cymbals
Glockenspiel
Xylophone
Gong
Triangle

Orchestral Version 
The orchestral version is orchestrated for a symphony orchestra.

Woodwinds
2 flutes and piccolo
2 oboes
Cor anglais
Clarinet in A
Clarinet in B
Bass clarinet in B
2 bassoons
Double bassoon

Brass
4 horns in F
3 trumpets in C
2 tenor trombones
Bass trombone
Tuba

Percussion
Timpani
Bass drum
Cymbals
Triangle
Xylophone
Gong

Strings
Violins
Violas
Cellos
Basses

Music 

Hammersmith begins in F minor and  time. It opens with a Prelude section, marked poco adagio, a deep bass ostinato repeating throughout.

Cantrick described the first theme; "As this figure begins its manifold repetitions, horns above it softly unfold a long-breathed cantilena... flutes and bassoons take over the cantilena." The second theme begins in the flutes. Multiple new themes continue to be introduced as the original flute theme is played underneath.

The music returns to a slow section, marked meno mosso. Cantrick writes, "floating out of nowhere in the middle reeds and passing on down to the horns, the long-breathed cantilena of the Prelude returns, flooding out everything else." The ostinato in the bass returns, the tempo now molto adagio. The first theme from the Scherzo returns, played one after the other by solo woodwinds. The cantilena is reintroduced in the horns; the bass ostinato fades out into silence.

Reception 

The symphony was dedicated "To the author of The Water Gypsies", the humorist and politician A. P. Herbert, who reflected upon his life along the British waterways in the novel.

As the work was unplayed after its premiere until 1954, there are no known reviews from immediately after the composition of the work. After Cantrick unearthed the work, numerous reviews were released as the work was recorded and broadcast. Murray Carmack wrote in The Musical Times in 1963:

I heard it once, in a BBC broadcast, and thought it a fine work; and think so again reading this score in which the brilliant boisterous pages are controlled by a keen, clear intelligence; and the prelude, central episode and coda evoke, so beautifully, a solitude and peace that can be found in the heart of London's bustle.Frederick Fennell remarked that, "Hammersmith still represents some of the most treacherous stretches of music making in all of the band's literature."

Discography

Band Version 
 Timothy Reynish with the Royal Northern College of Music Wind Orchestra (Chandos, 1999)
 Frederick Fennell with the United States Marine Band (Altissimo, 2008)
 John P. Lynch with the University of Georgia Wind Ensemble (Naxos, 2009)
 Howard Dunn with the Dallas Wind Symphony (Reference Recordings, 2012)

Orchestra Version 
Sir Adrian Boult with the London Symphony Orchestra (Lyrita, 1992)
Richard Hickox with the London Symphony Orchestra (Chandos, 1996)
David Lloyd-Jones with the Royal Scottish National Orchestra (Naxos, 1998)

References

Sources

External links 

Compositions by Gustav Holst
Concert band pieces
Music with dedications
1930 compositions
Hammersmith